During the 1996–97 English football season, Grimsby Town competed in the Football League First Division.

Transfers

Transfers In

Loans In

Transfers Out

Loans Out

Season summary
The Mariners were relegated from Division One. Despite flowing goals from Clive Mendonca and good performances from John Oster and newcomer Kingsley Black, Grimsby failed to save themselves. The club had suffered from the losses of ever-present goalkeeper Paul Crichton and Gary Croft, who made a £1.5 million move to Blackburn Rovers. Manager Brian Laws had been sacked late in 1996; John Cockerill and Kenny Swain both had stints as caretaker during the season. At the end of the season, former manager Alan Buckley, who had taken Grimsby from the Fourth to the old Second Division in his first stint in charge, rejoined the club in an attempt to take Grimsby back to the second tier.

Kit
Italian company Lotto became Grimsby's new kit manufacturers, and introduced a new kit for the season. Europe's Food Town remained kit sponsors.

Results

First Division

FA Cup

League Cup

League table

Squad overview

References

Grimsby Town F.C. seasons
Grimsby Town